The Waco 10/GXE/Waco O series was a range of three-seat open-cockpit biplanes built by the Advance Aircraft Company, later the Waco Aircraft Company.

Design and development
The Waco 10 was a larger span development of the Waco 9, both single-engined three-seat single-bay biplanes constructed around steel-tube frames.  The wing covering was fabric, and both upper and lower planes carried ailerons, which were strut linked.  The two passengers sat side by side in a cockpit under the upper wing and ahead of the pilot, who had a separate cockpit.  It had a split-axle fixed undercarriage and a tailwheel. The main undercarriage was fitted with hydraulic shock absorbers, unusual at the time on a light aircraft. The fin could be trimmed on the ground to offset engine torque, and the tailplane could be trimmed in flight.  Initially it was powered by a Curtiss OX-5 water-cooled 90° V-8 engine producing .

Its first flight was in 1927. It was numerically the most important type to be built by Waco, with at least 1,623 built over a period of 7 years from 1927 to 1933 and was fitted with a very large variety of engines of radial and V configuration.

Operational history

The Waco 10 turned out to have excellent handling, and there was a ready supply of war-surplus Curtiss engines.  It was widely used for the popularisation of aeronautics through barnstorming and joyrides, and was also much used as a trainer and by small operators for charter flights.

Variants
In 1928, after the Waco 10 had entered production, Waco changed its designation system so that the basic model 10, powered by a  Curtiss OX-5 engine became the GXE.

Later aircraft used three-letter designations, the first denoting the engine (except for the two mailplanes), the second denoting the wing installed, S or T meaning Straight or Tapered wing, and the final O indicating it was a derivative of the 10.  An -A suffix indicated an armed variant intended for export.

Apart from the water-cooled V-8 Curtiss and Hispano-Suiza engines, all of the rest were air-cooled radials.

Other engines were fitted experimentally, without unique designations, including the Rausie, Ryan-Siemens, and  Milwaukee Tank engine. This last engine was an air-cooled version of the Curtiss OX-5, and was intended as an aircraft engine.

The JYM and JWM were mailplane derivatives with a 14" fuselage stretch.

In the 1990s the unrelated The WACO Aircraft Company in Forks, Washington offered a homebuilt kit version of the ATO model.

The WACO 240-A was a straight-wing fighter, built for export, powered by  Wright engine. At least six were bought by the Cantonese Chinese aviation services. They were armed with twin .30 Browning machine guns and had racks for five  or two  bombs.

There was also an export model WACO Pursuit 300T-A, with  Wright or Wasp Jr engine.

Surviving aircraft

Specifications (Waco GXE)

See also

Aircraft of comparable role, configuration and era 
(Partial listing, only covers most numerous types)

Alexander Eaglerock
American Eagle A-101
Brunner-Winkle Bird
Buhl-Verville CA-3 Airster
Command-Aire 3C3
Parks P-1
Pitcairn Mailwing
Spartan C3
Stearman C2 and C3
Swallow New Swallow
Travel Air 2000 and 4000

Related lists 

 List of aircraft
 List of civil aircraft

References

Further reading

 
 
 

1920s United States civil utility aircraft
Aerobatic aircraft
10
Biplanes
Single-engined tractor aircraft
Aircraft first flown in 1927